Chambered is an adjective related to the word chamber. It may refer to:
 Chambered body, an element of some electric guitars
 Chambered cairn or Chambered long barrow, types of megalithic burial monument
 Chambered nautilus (Nautilus pompilius), the best-known species of nautilus
 Chambered stinkhorn (Lysurus periphragmoides), a species of fungus
 Three chambered heart or Four chambered heart, types of hearts
 The Four-Chambered Heart, a 1950 autobiographical novel

See also 
 Camerata (disambiguation), the Latin equivalent of the word